Ambrose Blacklock (May 17, 1784 – October 5, 1866) was a Scottish-born farmer, physician and political figure in Upper Canada.

He was born in Dumfries and studied medicine in Scotland. In 1807, he was commissioned as a surgeon in the Royal Navy. He served on lakes Ontario and Champlain during the War of 1812. Blacklock lived in Cornwall and later St. Andrews. He married Catherine Macdonell. Blacklock served as a justice of the peace and coroner for the Eastern District.

He represented Stormont in the Legislative Assembly of Upper Canada from 1828 to 1830 as a Reformer.

He died at St. Andrews at the age of 82.

References 
Becoming Prominent: Leadership in Upper Canada, 1791-1841, J.K. Johnson (1989)

1784 births
1866 deaths
People from Dumfries
Members of the Legislative Assembly of Upper Canada
Canadian justices of the peace
Canadian coroners
British emigrants to pre-Confederation Ontario